John McDuffie (September 25, 1883 – November 1, 1950) was a United States representative from Alabama and a United States district judge of the United States District Court for the Southern District of Alabama.

Education and career

Born on September 25, 1883, in River Ridge, Monroe County, Alabama, McDuffie was educated by private tutors. He attended college at Southern University (now Birmingham–Southern College) in Greensboro and later attended Alabama Polytechnic Institute (now Auburn University) in Auburn, Alabama, where he in graduated with a Bachelor of Science degree in 1904. McDuffie received a Bachelor of Laws from the University of Alabama School of Law in 1908. He was admitted to the bar the same year. A Democrat, he was elected to the Alabama House of Representatives in 1907 and served until 1911. He later became a prosecutor for the First Judicial Circuit Court of Alabama and served there until 1919.

Congressional service

McDuffie was elected to the United States House of Representatives in 1918, and served from March 4, 1919, until his resignation on March 2, 1935. During his tenure in the House he served as Minority Whip for 71st Congress, and later as  Majority Whip for 72nd Congress. He also served as Chairman of the United States House Committee on Insular Affairs in 73rd and 74th Congress. He co-authored the Philippine Independence Act which provided for self-government of the Philippines and for Filipino independence from the United States after a period of ten years.

Federal judicial service

McDuffie was nominated by President Franklin D. Roosevelt on January 31, 1935, to a seat on the United States District Court for the Southern District of Alabama vacated by Judge Robert Tait Ervin. He was confirmed by the United States Senate on February 7, 1935, and received his commission on February 8, 1935. His service terminated on November 1, 1950, due to his death in Mobile, Alabama. He was interred in Pine Crest Cemetery in Mobile.

References

Sources
 
 

1883 births
1950 deaths
People from Monroe County, Alabama
Auburn University alumni
Birmingham–Southern College alumni
Democratic Party members of the Alabama House of Representatives
Judges of the United States District Court for the Southern District of Alabama
United States district court judges appointed by Franklin D. Roosevelt
20th-century American judges
University of Alabama School of Law alumni
Democratic Party members of the United States House of Representatives from Alabama